Under Suspicion is a 1918 American silent film comedy-mystery directed by Will S. Davis and starring Francis X. Bushman and Beverly Bayne. Based upon the short story "The Woolworth Diamonds" by Hugh C. Weir that appeared in The Saturday Evening Post, it was produced and distributed by Metro Pictures.

This is a lost film.

Plot
As described in a film magazine, Gerry Simpson (Bushman) meets newspaper reporter Virginia Blake (Bayne) and, after learning that she has no use for the idle rich, decides to become a reporter and make Virginia believe he is poor in order to win her. Both are very happy until Virginia comes to believe that Gerry is responsible for a series of robberies that have occurred at fashionable functions. She goes to his apartment but is interrupted by Gerry's valet. Gerry arrives home in time to save Virginia from the wrath of the crooked valet and after the thief is brought to justice, Virginia, convinced of Gerry's innocence, promises to marry him.

Cast
Francis X. Bushman as Gerry Simpson
Beverly Bayne as Virginia Blake
Eva Gordon as Mrs. Alice Woolworth
Hugh Jeffrey as Rogers
Frank Montgomery as Sweeney
Sidney D'Albrook as Murphy
Arthur Housman as Red Hogan
Jack Newton as Cassidy
Franklyn Hanna as Chief of detectives

Reception
Like many American films of the time, Under Suspicion was subject to cuts by city and state film censorship boards. The Chicago Board of Censors required cuts, in Reel 2, of the stealing from a safe, examining the loot after the valet gets home, and, in Reel 5, the stealing of a necklace.

References

External links
 

1918 films
American silent feature films
Films directed by Will S. Davis
Lost American films
Films based on short fiction
American black-and-white films
1910s comedy mystery films
American comedy mystery films
1918 lost films
Lost comedy films
1918 comedy films
1910s American films
Silent American comedy films
Silent mystery films